Thelma Dís Ágústsdóttir (born 30 September 1998) is an Icelandic basketball player for Ball State University and a member of the Icelandic national basketball team. She won the Icelandic championship and the Icelandic Basketball Cup in 2017 when she was named the Úrvalsdeild kvenna Domestic Player of the Year.

Basketball career

Keflavík 2013–2018
Thelma came up through the junior ranks of Keflavík, playing her first games during the 2013–2014 season.

In February 2017, she won the Icelandic Cup with Keflavík. She helped Keflavík to win the national championship in 2017, defeating reigning champions Snæfell 3-1 in the finals. In the fourth and deciding game, she had 13 points, 7 rebounds and 5 assists in Keflavík's 70-50 victory. After the season, she was named the Úrvalsdeild Kvenna Domestic Player of the Year.

Despite interest from colleges in the United States, she returned to Keflavík for the 2017–2018 season, helping them win the 2018 Icelandic Cup.

Ball State Cardinals 2018–2021
In June 2018, she agreed to play for Ball State University in the Mid-American Conference. During her freshman season, she started all 31 games, averaging 9.6 points and 4.1 rebounds per game.

On 31 December 2019, she scored 21 points and made 5 of her three point shots in an 84-49 victory against Urbana University.

During her final season, she averaged 11.8 points while making 44% of her three point shots.

Return to Keflavík 2021
On 10 May, it was announced that Thelma would play with Keflavík during the 2021 Úrvalsdeild playoffs. She appeared in all three games during Keflavík's first round loss against Haukar where she averaged 6.0 points and 3.7 assists per game.

Ball State Cardinals 2021–present
Following the playoffs, she announced that she would return to Ball State to finish her masters degree and her remaining college eligibility.

National team career
Thelma Dís was selected to the Icelandic national team for the first time in November 2016. She was part of Iceland's squad that won silver at the 2017 Games of the Small States of Europe.

Personal life
Thelma Dís is the daughter of Björg Hafsteinsdóttir, a former basketball player who won multiple titles with Keflavík and was named the Domestic player of the year in 1990.

References

External links
Icelandic statistics at kki.is
Ball State profile at ballstatesports.com

1998 births
Living people
Ball State Cardinals women's basketball players
Thelma Dis Agustsdottir
Thelma Dis Agustsdottir
Thelma Dis Agustsdottir
Thelma Dis Agustsdottir
Forwards (basketball)